Han (221–263), known in historiography as Shu Han or Ji Han (  "Junior Han"), or often shortened to Shu (pinyin: shŭ < Middle Chinese: *źjowk < Eastern Han Chinese: *dźok), was a dynastic state of China and one of the three major states that competed for supremacy over China in the Three Kingdoms period. The state was based in the area around present-day Hanzhong, Sichuan, Chongqing, Yunnan, Guizhou, and north Guangxi, an area historically referred to as "Shu" based on the name of the past ancient state of Shu, which also occupied this approximate geographical area. Its core territory also coincided with Liu Bang's Kingdom of Han, the precursor of the Han dynasty.

Shu Han's founder, Liu Bei (Emperor Zhaolie), had named his dynasty "Han", as he considered it a rump state of the Han dynasty and thus the legitimate successor to the Han throne, while the prefix "Shu" was first used by the rival state of Cao Wei to delegitimize the orthodoxy claims of the Shu Han state. Later on when writing the Records of the Three Kingdoms, the historian, Chen Shou, also used the prefix "Shu" to describe Liu Bei's state of Han as a historiographical prefix to differentiate it from the many other states officially named "Han" throughout Chinese history.

History

Beginnings and founding

Towards the end of the Eastern Han dynasty, Liu Bei, a warlord and distant relative of the Han imperial clan, rallied the support of many capable followers. Following the counsel of his advisor, Zhuge Liang, and Zhuge's Longzhong Plan, Liu Bei conquered parts of Jing Province (covering present-day Hubei and Hunan) in 208 and 209, took over Yi Province (covering present-day Sichuan and Chongqing) from the warlord Liu Zhang between 212 and 214, and wrestled control of Hanzhong from his rival, Cao Cao, in 219. Afterwards, Liu Bei proclaimed himself King of Hanzhong.

From the territories he gained, Liu Bei established a position for himself in China during the final years of the Han dynasty. However, in 219, the alliance between Liu Bei and his ally, Sun Quan, was broken when Sun sent his general, Lü Meng, to invade Jing Province. Liu Bei lost his territories in Jing Province to Sun Quan. Guan Yu, the general guarding Liu Bei's assets in Jing Province, was captured and subsequently executed by Sun Quan's forces.

Cao Cao died in 220, and was succeeded by his son, Cao Pi, who forced the last Han ruler, Emperor Xian, to abdicate the throne in his favour. Cao Pi then established the state of Cao Wei, and declared himself emperor. Liu Bei contested Cao Pi's claim to the throne, and proclaimed himself “Emperor of Han” in 221. Although Liu Bei is widely seen as the founder of Shu Han, he never claimed to be the founder of a new dynasty; rather, he viewed Shu Han as a continuation of the Han dynasty.

To distinguish the state from other historical Chinese states of the same name, historians have added a relevant character to the state's original name: the state that called itself “Han” (漢) is also known as “Shu Han” (蜀漢) or just “Shu” (蜀).

Liu Bei's reign

Liu Bei ruled as emperor for less than three years. In 222, he launched a campaign against Sun Quan to retake Jing Province and avenge Guan Yu, culminating in the Battle of Xiaoting. However, due to grave tactical mistakes, Liu Bei suffered a crushing defeat at the hands of Sun Quan's general, Lu Xun, and lost the bulk of his army. He survived the battle and retreated to Baidicheng, where he died from illness a year later.

Liu Shan's reign

Before Liu Bei's death, he appointed the chancellor Zhuge Liang and the general Li Yan as regents to his son, Liu Shan. The young Liu Shan was only 16 years old, making him the youngest of the rulers of the Three Kingdom states, and Liu Bei expected the two regents to assist Liu Shan in managing state affairs. Zhuge Liang was the de facto head of the Shu government throughout Liu Shan's reign, and was responsible for most of Shu's policies during his regency.

When Liu Shan succeeded his father, Shu was the weakest of the three major powers. Following his father's defeat in 221, the portion of Jing Province previously held by Shu was now firmly under the control of Wu. Shu only included the western lands of Yi Province, while Wei controlled all of the northern lands, and Wu controlled all the lands from the east of Yi Province to the southern and eastern coastlines. Meanwhile, Shu's population was not large enough to stand against the rival state of Wei. This greatly limited Shu in terms of resources and manpower; although the country could efficiently defend itself, Shu could not easily launch successful campaigns. As such, Zhuge Liang parleyed for peace with Wu, and reaffirmed the alliance between Sun Quan and Shu — with the former even recognising Sun Quan's legitimacy when the latter broke with Wei, and declared himself “Emperor of Wu” in 229.  In order to strengthen the Shu Han state's authority in the remote southern region of Nanzhong, Zhuge Liang also launched an expeditionary force there in 225 to quell local rebellions, and the growing influence of the Nanman (literal: southern barbarians) in the region.

Zhuge Liang advocated an aggressive foreign policy towards Wei, because he strongly believed it was critical to the survival of Shu and its sovereignty. Between the years of 228 and 234, he launched a series of five military campaigns against Wei, with the aim of conquering Chang'an, a strategic city located on the road to the Wei capital, Luoyang. Most of the battles were fought around present-day Gansu and Shaanxi provinces. However, aside from gaining Jiang Wei as an officer in 228, Shu failed to achieve any significant victories or lasting gains in the five expeditions. During his final campaign where he fought against the Wei general, Sima Yi, an already taxed and ill Zhuge Liang died under the strain of the long stalemate with the Wei forces at the Battle of Wuzhang Plains.

After Zhuge Liang’s death, the Shu government was then headed by Jiang Wan, Fei Yi, and others, and Shu temporarily ceased its aggression towards Wei. In 244, the Wei regent, Cao Shuang, launched an invasion of Hanzhong. Despite being outnumbered 2-to-1, the Shu forces defeated the invading combatants at the Battle of Xingshi, with the humiliated Wei forces fleeing. Between 247 and 262, the Shu general, Jiang Wei, resumed Zhuge Liang's legacy by leading a series of military campaigns against Wei, but also failed to make any significant territorial gains.

Fall of Shu

In 263, armies led by the Wei generals Deng Ai and Zhong Hui attacked Shu, and conquered its capital, Chengdu, without much struggle — the state having been exhausted by Jiang Wei's ill-fated campaigns. In the same year, Liu Shan surrendered to Deng Ai outside Chengdu, marking the end of Shu. In spite of this, Jiang Wei attempted to incite conflict between Deng Ai and Zhong Hui, in the hope of taking advantage of the situation to revive Shu. Zhong Hui captured Deng Ai, and openly rebelled against the Wei regent, Sima Zhao, but the revolt was suppressed by Wei forces. Jiang Wei, Zhong Hui, and Deng Ai were killed in the struggle.

Liu Shan was brought to Luoyang, where he met with Sima Zhao, and was awarded the title of “Duke of Anle.” He lived a comfortable and peaceful life in Luoyang until the end of his days.

Economy
Shu was not merely a nation at war. During peacetime, the Shu state began many irrigation and road-building projects designed to improve the economy. Many of these public works still exist and are widely used. For example, the Zipingpu Dam is still present near Chengdu, Sichuan. These works helped improve the economy of southwestern China, and can be seen as the beginning of economic activity in Sichuan. It also promoted trade with southern China, which was then ruled by Eastern Wu.

List of territories

List of emperors

References 

 
221 establishments
263 disestablishments
Dynasties in Chinese history
Former countries in Chinese history
Former monarchies